The European Rugby Champions Cup is an annual rugby union competition for European clubs whose countries compete in the Six Nations Championship. Introduced in 2014, the competition replaced the Heineken Cup, which had been run by European Rugby Cup (ERC) since 1995, following disagreements between its shareholders over the structure and governance of the competition.

It is organised by European Professional Club Rugby (EPCR), with teams qualifying via their final positions in their respective national/cross-border leagues (Premiership, Top 14, and Pro14). The winners of the first final were French team Toulouse, who beat Welsh side Cardiff 21–18 after extra time.

20 teams initially compete in five separate pools. The top eight teams from the pools progress to the knockout stage. If the score in a knockout match is a draw after 80 minutes of regular play, an additional 20-minute period of play, called extra time, is added. If the score remains tied, an additional 10 minutes of sudden-death extra time are played, with the first team to score points immediately declared the winner. If no team is able to break the tie during extra time, the winner is ultimately decided by a penalty shootout. As well as the first final, the 2005 final between French teams Toulouse and Stade Français went to extra time, which Toulouse won 18–12.

Toulouse are the most successful team in the history of the tournament, with five wins. Leinster have won the competition four times, while Toulon and Saracens are third with three wins. Toulon are the only team to have won three consecutive tournaments, from 2013 to 2015. Three teams have played in more than one final and failed to win any of them – Clermont three times, Racing 92, Stade Français and Biarritz twice. No teams from Scotland and Italy have progressed to the final.

The 2017–18 final was held in Bilbao, marking the first time that the final was contested in a country without a team participating in the competition. The 2020–21 final was relocated from Marseille to London. and the 2021–22 final was held in Marseille instead.

Finals

Performances

By club

By nation

References

External links
 Official website

 
Rugby union-related lists